ResKnife is an open-source resource editor for the Apple Macintosh platform. It supports reading and writing resource maps to any fork (data, resource or otherwise) and has basic template-based and hexadecimal editing functionality. ResKnife can export resource data to flat files and supports third-party plug-in editors.

See also 
 ResEdit

External links 
  - (Source code and documentation)
 ResKnife at CNet Downloads (PPC Binary Download)
 ResKnife Lion Compile (OSX 10.7 (Lion) compatible version)

C++ software
Objective-C software
MacOS-only software
Programming tools